2010–11 Pirveli Liga was the 22nd season of the Georgian Pirveli Liga. The season began on 29 August 2010 and finished on 24 May 2011.

Teams

Results

See also 
 2010–11 Umaglesi Liga
 2010–11 Georgian Cup

External links
 Results, fixtures, tables at Soccerway

Erovnuli Liga 2 seasons
2010–11 in Georgian football
Georgia